The Texas Commission on Jail Standards (TCJS) is an agency of the Government of Texas.

Headquartered in the William Clements State Office Building in Downtown Austin, the agency oversees county jails to ensure standards of construction and operation. The agency was created in 1975.

References

External links
 Texas Commission on Jail Standards

State agencies of Texas